Longstreet is an English surname. Notable people with the surname include:

Augustus Baldwin Longstreet (1790–1870), American humorist, lawyer, college president, Southerner, writer
Helen Dortch Longstreet (1863–1962), American author and feminist, second wife of James Longstreet
James Longstreet (1821–1904), Confederate general
Stephen Longstreet (1907–2002), American author
Victor M. Longstreet (1906–2000), American economist and Assistant Secretary of the Navy
William Longstreet (c. 1760–1814), American inventor

English-language surnames